Soul Summit is an album by saxophonists Gene Ammons and Sonny Stitt with organist Jack McDuff recorded in 1962 and released on the Prestige label.

Reception
The Allmusic review stated "Overall, this is an interesting and consistently swinging set that adds to the large quantity of recordings that the great Ammons did during the early '60s".

Track listing 
All compositions by Gene Ammons except where noted
 "Tubby" - 9:10     
 "Dumplin'" (Sonny Stitt) - 5:00     
 "When You Wish Upon a Star" (Leigh Harline, Ned Washington) - 4:30     
 "Shuffle Twist" - 6:00     
 "Sleeping Susan" (Jimmy Mundy) - 5:35     
 "Out in the Cold Again" (Rube Bloom, Ted Koehler) - 6:40

Personnel 
Gene Ammons, Sonny Stitt - tenor saxophone
Jack McDuff - organ
Charlie Persip - drums

References 

1962 albums
Prestige Records albums
Gene Ammons albums
Sonny Stitt albums
Jack McDuff albums
Albums recorded at Van Gelder Studio
Albums produced by Esmond Edwards
Collaborative albums